Magnetic Reference Laboratory (MRL) is an American company founded in 1972. They make and sell Calibration Tapes for analog audio magnetic tape reproducers in the Open Reel format .

Origins 
In 1972 (Jay) John G. McKnight was laid off from Ampex, as was (Tony) Antonio Bardakos, who was making the calibration tapes for Ampex at the time. Along with Ed Seaman (also an ex-Ampex employee), McKnight and Bardakos decided to start their own calibration tape business, and thus Magnetic Reference Lab (MRL) was born in 1972.

Products 
MRL makes a wide variety of calibration tapes (a tape that "contains test signals used to calibrate a tape reproducer so that it will conform to the accepted standards") that are sold world-wide. Examples of available test signals include:
Multifrequency (general purpose, for setting reproducer gain, azimuth, and frequency response from 32 Hz to 20 kHz)
Polarity Calibration
Special signals for Sound Technology or for Audio Precision measurement systems
Fast Swept-frequency for use with an oscilloscope
Slow Swept-frequency for use with a plotter
Single frequencies
Broadband pink noise
Broadband white noise
Chromatic Sweep for use on a reproducer's VU meter

Customers 
MRL's calibration tapes are used by anyone who wants to have their analog audio magnetic tape reproducer properly calibrated, including:
 Professional music studios
 Radio stations
 Audio departments at major universities
 Theme parks

References

External links
Magnetic Reference Laboratory

Technology companies established in 1972
Manufacturing companies based in California
1972 establishments in California
Technical specifications